Uusi Runo is a 1943 poetry collection by Finnish poet Aaro Hellaakoski.

The title meaning "new poem" - was written during the Continuation War at night following Helaakoski's absence from writing in the 1930s.

Extract

External links and sources
 

1943 poetry books
Finnish poetry collections